Pangaea is an Australian punk and metal band from  Brisbane.

Members
Dave Atkins (Resin Dogs, Wolfmother) – drums
Paul Bromley (George) – guitar
Ben Ely (Regurgitator, Broken Head, The Stalkers, Jump 2 Light Speed) – vocals, bass guitar
Jim Sinclair – guitar
Spacey - percussion

Discography

Albums

Extended plays

Singles

References

Musical groups from Brisbane